Neysan may refer to:
 Neysan, Markazi
 Neysan District, in Khuzestan Province
 Neysan Rural District, in Khuzestan Province